Pothyne kualabokensis is a species of beetle in the family Cerambycidae. It was described by Hayashi in 1976.

References

kualabokensis
Beetles described in 1976